The 2022 Torneig Internacional de Tennis Femení Solgironès was a professional tennis tournament played on outdoor clay courts. It was the sixth edition of the tournament which was part of the 2022 ITF Women's World Tennis Tour. It took place in La Bisbal d'Empordà, Spain between 9 and 15 May 2022.

Singles main draw entrants

Seeds

 1 Rankings are as of 25 April 2022.

Other entrants
The following players received wildcards into the singles main draw:
  Marina Bassols Ribera
  Jéssica Bouzas Maneiro
  Irene Burillo Escorihuela
  Solana Sierra

The following players received entry from the qualifying draw:
  Erika Andreeva
  Yvonne Cavallé Reimers
  Cristiana Ferrando
  Ilona Georgiana Ghioroaie
  Lina Glushko
  Guiomar Maristany
  Andreea Prisăcariu
  Daniela Vismane

Champions

Singles

  Wang Xinyu def.  Erika Andreeva, 3–6, 7–6(7–0), 6–0

Doubles

  Victoria Jiménez Kasintseva /  Renata Zarazúa def.  Alicia Barnett /  Olivia Nicholls, 6–4, 2–6, [10–8]

References

External links
 2022 Torneig Internacional de Tennis Femení Solgironès at ITFtennis.com
 Official website

2022 ITF Women's World Tennis Tour
2022 in Spanish tennis
May 2022 sports events in Spain